Whistling without the use of an artificial whistle is achieved by creating a small opening with one's lips, usually after applying moisture (licking one's lips or placing water upon them) and then blowing or sucking air through the space. The air is moderated by the lips, curled tongue, teeth or fingers (placed over the mouth or in various areas between pursed lips) to create turbulence, and the curled tongue acts as a resonant chamber to enhance the resulting sound by acting as a type of Helmholtz resonator. By moving the various parts of the lips, fingers, tongue and epiglottis, one can then manipulate the types of whistles produced.

Techniques

Pucker whistling is the most common form in much Western music. Typically, the tongue tip is lowered, often placed behind the lower teeth, and pitch altered by varying the position of the tongue. Although varying the degree of pucker will change the pitch of a pucker whistle, expert pucker whistlers will generally only make small variations to the degree of pucker, due to its tendency to affect purity of tone. Pucker whistling can be done by either only blowing out or blowing in and out alternately. In the 'only blow out' method, a consistent tone is achieved, but a negligible pause has to be taken to breathe in. In the alternating method there is no problem of breathlessness or interruption as breath is taken when one whistles breathing in, but a disadvantage is that many times, the consistency of tone is not maintained, and it fluctuates.

Many expert musical palatal whistlers will substantially alter the position of the tongue to ensure a good quality tone. Venetian gondoliers are famous for moving the tongue while they whistle in a way that can look like singing. A good example of a palatal whistler is Luke Janssen, winner of the 2009 world whistling competition.

Finger whistling is harder to control but achieves a piercing volume. In Boito's opera Mefistofele the title character uses it to express his defiance of the Almighty.

Whistling can also be produced by blowing air through enclosed, cupped hands or through an external instrument, such as a whistle or even a blade of grass or leaf.

Competitions 
One of the most well known whistling competitions is the International Whistlers Convention (IWC). This annual event has taken place in Louisburg, North Carolina from 1973 to 2013. The awards go to whistlers ranging from international male and female, teenage male and female, and even grandchildren. It has been customary for the Governor of the State of North Carolina to sign a declaration declaring the week of the IWC as "Happy Whistlers Week," for citizens and visitors to honor the art of whistling and to participate in the scheduled events.

One of the most prolific whistling competitors is a Virginia-based communications expert, Christopher W. Ullman who has won the competition so many times he is listed in the International Whistling Hall of Fame. Ullman has won the Grand Championship of the International Whistling Contest three times, in 1996, 1999, and 2000. In 1994, he was the National Grand Champion in the National Whistling Contest. In 1999, he was given the Lillian Williams Achievement Award as Whistling Entertainer of the Year.

According to Guinness World Records, the highest pitch human whistle ever recorded was measured at 10,599 Hz, which corresponds to an E9 musical note. This was done by Joshua Lockard in Southlake, Texas, on May 1, 2019. The lowest pitch whistle ever recorded was measured at 174.6 Hz, which corresponds to an F3 musical note. This was accomplished by Jennifer Davies (Canada) at the Impossibility Challenger Games in Dachau, Germany, on 6 November 2006. The most people whistling simultaneously was 853, which was organized at the Spring Harvest event at Minehead, UK on April 11, 2014.

As communication
On La Gomera, one of Spain's Canary Islands, a traditional whistled language, Silbo Gomero, is still used. At least nine separate whistling sounds are used to produce usually four vowels and five consonants, allowing this language to convey unlimited words. The language allowed people (such as shepherds) to communicate over long distances in the island, when other communication means were not available. It is now taught in school so that it is not lost among the younger generation. Another group of whistlers were the Mazateco Indians of Oaxaca, Mexico. Their whistling aided in conveying messages over far distances but was used also in close quarters as a unique form of communication with a variety of tones.

Whistling can be used to control trained animals such as dogs. A shepherd's whistle is often used instead.

Whistling has long been used as a specialized communication between laborers. For example, whistling in theatre, particularly on-stage, is used by flymen (members of a fly crew) to cue the lowering or raising of a batten pipe or flat. This method of communication became popular before the invention of electronic means of communication, and is still in use, primarily in older "hemp" houses during the set and strike of a show.

Burrowing animals species are known to whistle to communicate threats, such as marmot species including the groundhog (woodchuck) and the alpine marmot. Whistling is used by animals such as prairie dogs to communicate threats, who have one of the most complex communication systems in the animal kingdom. Prairie dogs are able to communicate an animals speed, shape, size, species and for humans specific attire and if the human is carrying a gun. This method of communication is usually done by having a sentry stand on two feet surveying for potential threats while the rest of the pack finds food. Once a threat has been identified the sentry sounds a whistle alarm, (sometimes describing the threat) at which point the pack retreats to their burrows. The intensity of the threat is usually determined by how long the sentry whistles. The sentry continues to whistle the alarm until the entirety of the pack have gone to safety at which point the sentry returns to the burrow.

In music
The range of pucker whistlers varies from about one to three octaves. Agnes Woodward classifies by analogy to voice types: soprano (c"-c""), mezzo (a-g'") and alto (e or d-g")

Many performers on the music hall and Vaudeville circuits were professional whistlers (also known as siffleurs), the most famous of whom were Ronnie Ronalde and Fred Lowery. The term puccalo or puccolo was coined by Ron McCroby to refer to highly skilled jazz whistling.

Whistling is featured in a number of television themes, such as Lassie, The Andy Griffith Show and Mark Snow's title theme for The X-Files.
It also prominently features in the score of the movie Twisted Nerve, composed by Bernard Herrmann, which was later used in Quentin Tarantino's Kill Bill.

Roger Whittaker released albums with whistling tracks such as "Mexican Whistler" and "Finnish Whistler".

By spectators
Whistling is often used by spectators at sporting events to express either enthusiasm or disapprobation. In the United States and Canada, whistling is used much like applause, to express approval or appreciation for the efforts of a team or a player, such as a starting pitcher in baseball who is taken out of the game after having pitched well. In much of the rest of the world, especially Europe and South America, whistling is used to express displeasure with the action or disagreement with an official's decision, like booing. This whistling is often loud and cacophonous, using finger whistling. Whistling is used by spectators attending concerts to show approval of the singer’s talent.

Cultural beliefs
In many cultures, whistling or making whistling noises in the morning is thought to attract good luck, good things, or good spirits.

In the UK there is a superstitious belief in the "Seven Whistlers" which are seven mysterious birds or spirits who call out to foretell death or a great calamity. In the 19th century, large groups of coal miners were known to have refused to enter the mines for one day after hearing this spectral whistling. The Seven Whistlers have been mentioned in literature such as The Faerie Queene by Edmund Spenser, as bearing an omen of death. William Wordsworth included fear of the Seven Whistlers in his poem, "Though Narrow Be That Old Man's Cares". The superstition has been reported in the Midlands of England but also in Lancashire, Essex, Kent, and even in other places such as North Wales and Portugal. The Iron Maiden Song "The Prophecy" from their album "Seventh Son of a Seventh Son" also references the "Seven Whistlers" as a portent of doom. 

In Russian and other Slavic cultures, and also in Romania and Lithuania, whistling indoors is superstitiously believed to bring poverty ("whistling money away"), whereas whistling outdoors is considered normal. In Estonia and Latvia, it is widely believed that whistling indoors may bring bad luck and therefore set the house on fire.

Whistling on board a sailing ship is thought to encourage the wind strength to increase. This is regularly alluded to in the Aubrey–Maturin books by Patrick O'Brian.

Theater practice has plenty of superstitions: one of them is against whistling. A popular explanation is that traditionally sailors, skilled in rigging and accustomed to the boatswain's pipe, were often used as stage technicians, working with the complicated rope systems associated with flying. An errant whistle might cause a cue to come early or a "sailor's ghost" to drop a set-piece on top of an actor. An offstage whistle audible to the audience in the middle of performance might also be considered bad luck.

Transcendental whistling (chángxiào 長嘯) was an ancient Chinese Daoist technique of resounding breath yoga, and skillful whistlers supposedly could summon supernatural beings, wild animals, and weather phenomena.

See also

 Alice J. Shaw, professional whistler
 
 Boatswain's call
 Hand flute
 Irish whistling champions
 
 Puirt à beul
 Rosita Serrano, whistling performer nicknamed Chilenische Nachtigall (Chilean Nightingale)
 Silbo Gomero language
 Slide whistle
 Tin whistle
 Wolf-whistling
 Whistle Pops
 Whistle register
 Whistled language
 Leaf whistle

References

External links

 Stekelenburg, A.V. van. "Whistling in Antiquity", Akroterion, vol. 45, pp. 65–74 (2000).
 Kahn, Ric. "Finally, whistling is cool again", Boston Globe, August 27, 2007
 Petri, Alexandra. "Not just anyone can whistle, at the 2013 International Whistling Convention", Washington Post (April 29, 2013).
 Casey, Liam. "Toronto whistler blows past the competition at international contest", Toronto Star (May 3, 2013).
 Lesson by Toronto whistler on how to do Palate Whistling
 International Whistlers Museum  in Louisburg, North Carolina
 Indian Whistlers Association (IWA)
 Professional whistler Dave Santucci provides whistling performance videos and whistling tutorial videos (YouTube)
 "History of Musical Whistling" given by Linda Parker Hamilton at the 2012 International Whistlers Convention (YouTube)
 Northern Nightingale site with whistling lessons and links to other whistlers' sites
 Biography page of whistling performer Robert Stemmons with links to other whistlers' sites

Oral communication
Vocal music
Vocal skills